Argyria contiguella is a moth in the family Crambidae. It was described by Philipp Christoph Zeller in 1872. It is found on Cuba.

References

Argyriini
Moths of Cuba
Endemic fauna of Cuba
Moths described in 1872
Taxa named by Philipp Christoph Zeller